Luise Danz (11 December 1917 – 21 June 2009) was a Nazi concentration camp guard in World War II. She was born in Walldorf (Werra) in Thuringia. Danz was captured in 1945 and put on trial for crimes against humanity at the Auschwitz trial in Kraków, Poland. She was sentenced to life imprisonment in 1947, but released due to general amnesty on 20 August 1957.

Camp work
On January 24, 1943, at the age of 25, Danz was conscripted as an SS-Aufseherin within the Nazi concentration camp system at Ravensbrück. She served as guard in several camps in occupied Poland, including Majdanek (1943-April 1944), Kraków-Płaszów (April 1944), Auschwitz-Birkenau (May 1944-January 1945) and Malchow (subcamp of Ravensbrück). In 1943, she received an award from Nazi Germany for her camp service. From 1 March 1943, she completed a three-week guard course at the Ravensbrück concentration camp and was on March 22, 1943 transferred to the Majdanek concentration camp. There she oversaw the women's camp work details in the camp tailoring, kitchen, nursery and clothing store. During the evacuation of Majdanek at the end of April 1944, Danz was in the Plaszow concentration camp. Halina Nelken remembered her in Plaszow: "Danz, tall, slender, and with a gaunt, boyish face was a specialist in punching jaws with her fist and at the same time bringing her knee up into a stomach.  The woman she was mistreating fainted immediately."

After the evacuation of Plaszow concentration camp Luise Danz was in Auschwitz-Birkenau in September or October 1944, where she oversaw a Jewish commando in the concentration camp laundry and led the leather detail as a Kommandofuhrerin, and eventually rose to the rank of Rapportfuhrerin in the camp for Hungarian Jewish women. After the evacuation of Auschwitz took place in January 1945, she was moved to Ravensbrück and on to its subcamp in Malchow. Danz became Oberaufseherin in Malchow in January 1945 upon her arrival and served in that capacity until the beginning of May 1945. In Malchow 900 female prisoners worked in Verwertchemie, the local explosives factory for recovery of chemicals work. Danz's behavior is said to have evolved according to statements of surviving prisoners of the different camps into that of a sadist. She severely abused prisoners, for example, with her bull whip. She also aided in the hanging of Russian women prisoners and hours-long prisoner roll calls which claimed many lives from exposure and exhaustion alone.

Capture and trials for war crimes

At the end of the war in May 1945, Danz tried to slip into obscurity, but was discovered, captured and arrested on 1 June 1945 in Lützow and tried by Poland at the Auschwitz Trial for crimes she had committed while on duty in the vast German camp system. At her 1947 trial, she was sentenced to life imprisonment, but was released early in 1957 after serving 10 years.

In 1947, survivor Mirosława Odi stated in the Municipal Court of Oświęcim that "As regards the defendant Luise Danz, I can state that the defendant was an SS woman and that she was very good, because she helped the prisoners and was punished for doing so three times with a 14-day long incarceration in the bunker. I know that this defendant used to turn a blind eye to all transgressions on the part of the prisoners. That SS woman worked for some time in the kitchen and later in the clothes sorting room."

In 1996, she was tried before a German court for the alleged murder of a teenager in the Malchow concentration camp. German doctors said the defendant was too old to be able to withstand court proceedings, so the charge was dropped.

See also
Female guards in Nazi concentration camps

References

1917 births
2009 deaths
Auschwitz concentration camp personnel
Female guards in Nazi concentration camps
German prisoners sentenced to life imprisonment
Holocaust perpetrators in Poland
Kraków-Płaszów concentration camp personnel
Majdanek concentration camp personnel
People convicted in the Auschwitz trial
Prisoners sentenced to life imprisonment by Poland
German people convicted of crimes against humanity
People extradited to Poland